Moscow is an unincorporated community in Hickman County, Kentucky, in the United States.

History
A post office was established at Moscow in 1829, and remained in operation until it was discontinued in 1955. Moscow was incorporated in 1831.

References

Unincorporated communities in Hickman County, Kentucky
Unincorporated communities in Kentucky